Laura Marie Bennett (née Reback, born 25 April 1975, in North Palm Beach, Florida) is an American professional triathlete. She placed fourth in the women's triathlon at the 2008 Summer Olympics. In 2012, she finished 17th at the London Olympic Games. She earned a silver medal at the World Triathlon Championships in 2003 and bronze medals in 2004, 2005, and 2007. She has also raced at the Half-Ironman distance, placing 5th at the 2009 Ironman 70.3 World Championship.

Athletic career

Early career
Bennett started triathlons at age 10, took up swimming at age 12. She attended Cardinal Newman High School where she ran track and swam. She was the Florida state champion in the mile and two mile races for two consecutive years. She attended at Southern Methodist University where she was a member of the swimming team and pursued a finance degree. In swimming she served as a co-captain, and was a member of the 1997 NCAA champion 400 medley relay. She graduated in 1997 with a BS in finance.

In 1993, she was a member of the USA Triathlon Junior National Team, and was voted the USA Triathlon and Triathlete Magazine Junior of the Year in 1994.  In 1997, after completing college, she was the second U.S. amateur at the World Championship in Perth, Australia.

Professional
Bennett turned pro in 1998 after placing as the second U.S. amateur at the 1997 World Championship. That same year she began competing on the International Triathlon Union (ITU) racing circuit. She earned a silver medal at the World Triathlon Championships in 2003 and bronze medals in 2004, 2005, and 2007.

Bennett first earned a spot on the Olympic team as the second alternate for the U.S. triathlon team at the 2000 Summer Olympics, and as the first alternate in the 2004 Summer Olympics. At the 2008 Summer Olympics, she was the first American to qualify for the team, by placing first American, and third overall, in the Beijing 2007 trials.  At the games, she placed fourth with a time of 2:00:21.54.

In 2009, Bennett made her long distance triathlon debut at the Ironman Augusta 70.3 race in 2009. She won in a time of 4:18:36, just six seconds ahead of runner up Kelly Williamson, qualifying her for the 2009 Ironman 70.3 World Championship.  Bennett placed 5th at 2009 Ironman 70.3 World Championship with a time of 4:07:39.

In 2010, the ITU first started keeping track of segment rankings to reward the best athlete in each of the three disciplines throughout the Dextro Energy Triathlon ITU World Championship Series.  Bennett ranked first in the swim rankings 2010 season. That same year she was selected as the USAT 2010 Olympic/ITU Female Athlete of the Year for her consistent performances and end of season ranking during the 2010 racing season.

At the 2012 Summer Olympics, Bennett placed 17th in the women's triathlon with a time of 2:02:17.

Results

ITU competitions 
The following list of Bennett's results is based upon the official ITU rankings and the athlete's profile Page. Unless indicated otherwise, the events are triathlons (Olympic Distance) and belong to the Elite category.

Personal life
Bennett is married to Australian triathlete Greg Bennett.  Laura Bennett's father, Paul, and older brothers, David and John, have also competed in triathlons.

References

External links
Bennett Endurance website
Laura Bennett's Twitter

1975 births
Living people
American female triathletes
Olympic triathletes of the United States
Triathletes at the 2008 Summer Olympics
Triathletes at the 2012 Summer Olympics
Southern Methodist University alumni
People from North Palm Beach, Florida
21st-century American women
20th-century American women